The Eurus Wind Farm is a wind farm located in Juchitán de Zaragoza, Oaxaca, Mexico. The largest wind farm in Latin America, the partnership between Cemex and Acciona Energia cost US$550 million to build. Its 167 wind turbines combine to generate 250.5 megawatts (MW), sufficient power to supply about half a million people. By contrast with traditional means of power, it may reduce annual carbon dioxide emissions by 600,000 metric tons.

See also

List of onshore wind farms
Wind power in Mexico

References

Wind farms in Mexico